Vasile Maricel Ardeleanu (born 5 February 1974) is a Romanian former professional footballer who played as a centre back for clubs such as FCM Bacău, Acord Focșani, FC Onești or FC Vaslui.

Career
Ardeleanu played almost all his career for FCM Bacău, being one of the perspective players of the Moldavian club. In 1999 Ardeleanu career took a negative turn after a horror foul made by Marius Lăcătuș in the 13th minute of a match between Steaua București and FCM Bacău. Doctors' diagnosis was double transverse fracture of tibia and fibula, plus rupture of ligaments and although the end of his career was anticipated, Ardeleanu was back on the pitch one year later, playing for FC Onești, on loan from FCM Bacău.

Even if he has fully recovered, as Ardeleanu himself recognized years later, things have changed After the accident in 1999 I started smoking. I quickly reached 120 pounds, but then I dropped 40 pounds in one month. After some sporadic appearances at FC Onești and FCM Bacău, Ardeleanu retired only a few years later, in 2005, at the age of 31.

Personal life
Today, Ardeleanu lives in the village of Cârligi, Filipești commune, where he is working as a day laborer and playing sporadically for amateur team of the commune, AS Filipești.

Honours
FCM Bacău
Cupa Ligii: 1998

References

External links
 

1974 births
Living people
Sportspeople from Bacău
Romanian footballers
Association football defenders
Liga I players
Liga II players
FCM Bacău players
CSM Focșani players
FC Vaslui players